Foulke is a surname. Notable people with the surname include:

Edwin Foulke, American lawyer and government official
Keith Foulke (born 1972), American baseball player
William Foulke (footballer) (1874–1916), British soccer player
William Dudley Foulke (1848–1935), American poet and reformer

See also
Foulkes, another surname